East Coast Economic Region (ECER) (Jawi: ولايه ايكونومي ڤنتاي تيمور) is an economic development region based on the east coast of Peninsular Malaysia, which covers the states of Kelantan, Terengganu, and Pahang, and the Johorean districts of  Mersing and Segamat. ECER is also one of the three economic corridors launched in Peninsular Malaysia under the leadership of Prime Minister Abdullah Ahmad Badawi, the fifth Prime Minister of Malaysia. The other corridors are Iskandar Malaysia in Johor and the Northern Corridor Economic Region (NCER) that covers the states of Penang, Kedah, Perlis and Northern Perak. The ECER development program spans 12 years, beginning in 2007, and involves Public-Private Participation (PPP).

The master planner for ECER is Malaysia-owned oil and gas company, Petronas. while the other private sector partner is the plantation group IOI Group, a public listed company. Both private sector companies Petronas and IOI have a strong presence in the East Coast. The East Coast Economic Region Development Council was established to implement the master plan.

The ECER was launched by Malaysia's Prime Minister, Abdullah Ahmad Badawi in Kuala Terengganu, the state capital of Terengganu and Kota Bharu, the state capital of Kelantan on October 30, 2007 and the following day in Kuantan, the state capital of Pahang. During the launch, the Prime Minister announced a RM 6 billion allocation as part of public investment in this development corridor. The investment is primarily in high-impact projects that will serve as catalysts for the socio-economic development of the region, which occupies almost half of Peninsular Malaysia, and lagged the West Coast states it in terms of income and investments.

Prime Minister Najib Abdul Razak, who succeeded Abdullah Ahmad Badawi in 2008, continued the Malaysian leadership's commitment to corridor development, incorporating it into his Government Transformation Plan to bring to pass Malaysia's vision to become a high income developed nation in 2020. Two strategic initiatives under his leadership are ECER Special Economic Zone (ECER SEZ) and Malaysia-China Kuantan Industrial Park. Both are a first-of-its-kind initiatives in Malaysia, with the objective of fast-forwarding the inflow of FDI and industrialisation in the region.

According to the 2013 ECERDC Annual Report, as the end of 2013 the region had attracted RM55.8 billion in investments, well past the halfway mark of ECER's target of RM110 billion by 2020. An estimated 55,000 job opportunities have also been created in the region since 2007.

Projects involved

Transport
Currently, there is a Petronas owned railway track between Kerteh and Kuantan which is operated by Keretapi Tanah Melayu. The economic plan will:-
 Update the railway system and to connect railway line from Mentakab – Kuantan – Kuala Terengganu – Tanah Merah/Pasir Mas
 Update the railway system and to connect railway line from Tanah Merah/Pasir Mas – Butterworth and Kuala Lumpur – Mentakab

The East Coast Expressway phase 2, which will connect Kuantan and Kuala Terengganu is currently under construction. The development plan will increase the length of the expressway into two phases:-
 Phase 3 - Connection between Kuala Terengganu and Kota Bharu, ending in Pengkalan Kubor
 Phase 4 - Connection between Kuantan and Johor Bahru

Other development plans are:-
 Upgrading Central Spine Federal Road ( Kota Bharu - Gua Musang – Kuala Lipis – Karak – Kuala Pilah - Seremban )
 Upgrading current coastal roads and building new coastal roads.
 Upgrading current facilities of airport in Kuala Terengganu to international airport status.
 Upgrading current facilities of airports in Kuantan and Kota Bharu
 Expansion and upgrading of Kuantan and Kemaman Ports

Infrastructure
 Construction of Lebir Dam in Kelantan to ensure sufficient potable water supply
 Laying fiber optic cables along major towns
 Upgrade current facilities and constructing new ones to manage solid wastes
 Flood mitigation projects in Kelantan and Terengganu
 Protection against coastal erosion

See also 
 Kuantan
 Ninth Malaysia Plan
 Iskandar Malaysia
 Economy of Malaysia
 Sabah Development Corridor
 Sarawak Corridor of Renewable Energy

Notes and references

External links 
 
 Invest In Pahang official portal 
  
  
  
  
  
  
  

Development Corridors in Malaysia
Prime Minister's Department (Malaysia)
2008 establishments in Malaysia